Maryam Abad is a village located in Wazirabad Tehsil, Gujranwala District, Punjab, Pakistan. It is named after Mary, mother of Jesus, as there is considerable minority of Christians in the  village.

Demography 
Maryam Abad had a population of 1,066 in 2017. The population of Maryam Abad is 80% Muslim and 20% is Christians. Most people in this village speak Punjabi, though almost all of them can also speak Urdu, which is the national language of Pakistan. English is spoken by the elite in Maryam Abad. To receive commodities, the people of this village visit the nearby town of Ali Pur Chatta.

Education 
A government school is located in Maryam Abad. It is run by the Government of Punjab, Pakistan under the Board of Intermediate and Secondary Education, Gujranwala. For higher-level education, some students move to Kalaske Cheema and Ali Pur Chatta. For higher university level education, students move to Gujranwala, Gujrat, Pakistan and Lahore. Some private schools are located near this village, including:

 Government Girls Primary School (GGPS), Maryam Abad

Communication 
The only way to get to Maryam Abad is by road. This village is directly connected to the Gujranwala via Gujranwala-Ali Pur Chattha road. Rasool Nagar is the nearest railway station.

See also 
 Ajitke Chattha
 Shair Pur

References 

Villages in Gujranwala District